These sheep originated in the western province Hamadan, in Iran where it is the predominant breed. It is raised primarily for meat production. There is approximately 3 million head.

Multiple births, fertility and survival rate from birth to weaning is high. The wool is a light brown carpet wool quality which was favored in Persian carpets.

References

Sheep breeds originating in Iran
Sheep breeds